In optics, a Littrow prism or Littrow spectrograph or Littrow mirror is a retro-reflecting dispersing prism arranged in such a way that an incident light beam which enters at the Brewster angle undergoes minimal deviation and hence maximum dispersion.
Littrow prisms are typically 30°/60°/90° prisms, with a reflective film coating on the surface opposite the 60° angle. It was devised by Otto von Littrow (1843—1864).
Typically Littrow prisms are used in lasers at the end of an optical cavity to offer fine adjustment of the laser's output frequency by altering the angle of incidence.

Before the ready availability of diffraction gratings Littrow prisms were used widely in spectroscopy. They are still used in some UV instruments and in one section of some specialized double monochromators.

References 

Prisms (optics)